Maxime Thomas (born 17 December 1983) is a French para table tennis player who competes in international level events. He is a triple Paralympic bronze medalist, a World champion and six time European champion in team events. He is also a four-time World bronze medalist and double European champion in singles events.

Thomas was paralysed from the waist down aged 15 following a diagnosis of an autoimmune disease and he spent almost two years in a rehabilitation centre. He discovered para table tennis in 2000 when he got inspired by watching the 2000 Summer Paralympics once he left hospital, he played the sport that year and played competitively in 2001.

References

External links 
 
 

1983 births
Living people
Sportspeople from Nancy, France
Sportspeople from Lyon
Paralympic table tennis players of France
Table tennis players at the 2008 Summer Paralympics
Table tennis players at the 2012 Summer Paralympics
Table tennis players at the 2016 Summer Paralympics
Medalists at the 2008 Summer Paralympics
Medalists at the 2012 Summer Paralympics
Medalists at the 2016 Summer Paralympics
Table tennis players at the 2020 Summer Paralympics
French male table tennis players
21st-century French people
20th-century French people